Kervin René García Sandoval (born 7 December 1990) is a Guatemalan footballer who plays as a defender for Primera División club USAC.

Career
García is the youngest of 5 siblings, his brother Nathan is also a professional footballer in Guatemala. Kervin worked as a bricklayer and fisherman as he played amateur footballer on the side. He worked his way up through the Guatemalan football divisions, having played with Sanarate and Iztapa. On 19 July 2020, he signed with Antigua.

International career
García made his international debut for the Guatemala national team in a friendly 2–1 win over Honduras on 15 November 2020.

References

External links
 
 

1990 births
Living people
People from Izabal Department
Guatemalan footballers
Guatemala international footballers
Association football defenders
Liga Nacional de Fútbol de Guatemala players
Antigua GFC players
2021 CONCACAF Gold Cup players